Lepidodactylus lombocensis is a species of gecko. It is found on Lombok in the Lesser Sunda Islands.

References

Lepidodactylus
Reptiles described in 1929